Glen Roy Rohrer (December 8, 1920 - June 2003; aged 82) was a United States Army Sergeant First Class, who in August 1965 defected into communist Czechoslovakia and was subsequently used as a propaganda puppet by its communist regime. In the book Naked Sphinx (1976), by the Czechoslovak regime press, he was presented as an "American military intelligence officer" - while in fact he was a polygraph examiner. He died under suspicious circumstances in June 2003, his ashes were scattered on Malvazinky cemetery in Prague, all without the notification of his family.

Until his 1965 defection, Rohrer had been stationed as a polygraph operator at Camp King, Oberursel, Germany, which was a joint Army/CIA/ONI/BND facility used for debriefing East Bloc defectors. He assisted in defector interrogations as a polygraph operator.

Lydia K. a KGB colonel, is attributed as recruiting him.

References

US POWs and Spies – Czech Style
Al Santoli - To Bear Any Burden
Games of Intelligence 1990 (Archive)

1920 births
2003 deaths
American defectors
Czechoslovak spies against the United States
American spies
Czechoslovak spies
United States Army soldiers
American emigrants to Czechoslovakia